National Route 259 is a national highway of Japan connecting Toba, Mie and Toyohashi in Japan, with a total length of 47 km (29.2 mi).

Cultural references
An alternate reading of this highway numeral designation is ji-go-ku.  In Japanese, the word jigoku means Hell, and thus some Tahara residents refer to it as ji-go-ku-douro, or the "Highway to Hell".  This term gained popularity due to the perception of a higher fatality rate along the road, especially before it was widened and improved.

References

259
Roads in Aichi Prefecture
Roads in Mie Prefecture

ja:国道258号